Togbi Sri II  (1852–1956) was the Awoamefia (ruler) of the Anlo people of South East Ghana from 1906 to 1956.

Early life and education 
Sri II attended the Bremen Mission schools in Keta before working as a clerk in Sierra Leone and the German Cameroons.

Chieftaincy role 
Upon becoming Awoamefia, Sri II modernised the role, developing it into a constitutional monarchy. He abandoned the traditional practice of living in seclusion, and removed the ban on the wearing of European clothing in Anloga. He became friends with Francis Crowther, the District Commissioner at Keta, which helped him expand the influence of the Anlo Traditional State In 1912 Crowther, then Secretary for Native Affairs in the Gold Coast included Avenor, Afife, Aflao, Dzodze, Fenyi, Klikor, Some and Weta in the Anlo State.

References

1852 births
1956 deaths
Ghanaian royalty
People from Volta Region
Ewe people